Events in the year 1751 in Norway.

Incumbents
Monarch: Frederick V

Events
21 September - Stromstad Treaty of 1751 is signed, it defined the border between Sweden and Norway.
The Lapp Codicil of 1751 (addendum to the Stromstad Treaty) secures the right of the Sami people to continue their nomadic lifestyle between the borders.

Arts and literature

Births

Full date unknown
Johan Lausen Bull, jurist and politician (died 1817)
Niels Treschow, philosopher and politician (died 1833)

Deaths

23 January – Peter Schnitler, jurist and military officer (born 1690).

See also

References